Karttula is a former municipality of Finland. It was consolidated with the city of Kuopio on 1 January 2011.

The municipality was located in the Northern Savonia region.

The municipality was unilingually Finnish.

Karttula was consolidated with the city of Kuopio in 2011. Kuopio retained its name and coat of arms.

History 
Karttula was first mentioned in the 1620s, when it was a part of the Tavinsalmi (later Kuopio) parish. Its name is derived from the surname Karttunen. It was granted a chapel in 1769 and became its own parish in 1862.

References

External links

Municipality of Karttula – Official website 

 
Kuopio
Former municipalities of Finland
Populated places established in 1873
Populated places disestablished in 2011